The Beautiful Summer  is a 1974 Italian melodrama film directed by Sergio Martino. It stars Alessandro Cocco, Senta Berger and John Richardson.

The film is part of the genre of melodramatic films known as "lacrima movies" or "tearjerker movies". It has been best remembered for the soundtrack piece "Il barone rosso" by Luciano Michelini, which would eventually become the theme song of the comedy show, Curb Your Enthusiasm. It was originally released in the United States as Summer to Remember, with other titles such as Smile of Love and Never Ending Love.

Cast 

 Alessandro Cocco as Gianluca Bennati
 Senta Berger as Emanuela Bennati
 John Richardson as Vittorio Bennati
 Lino Toffolo as "The Red Baron"
 Caterina Boratto as The princess 
 Mario Erpichini as Giorgio Savona 
 Renzo Marignano as Pietro, the driver
 Duilio Cruciani as Marco
 Brizio Montinaro as The Teacher
 Sabina Gaddi as Olga
 Gildo di Marco as Giuseppe
 Carla Mancini
 Bernardo Toccaceli
 Lorenzo Piani

Release
The Beautiful Summer was originally released in Italy on December 6, 1974 where it was distributed by Titanus. 

In Japan, the film was released on September 27, 1975, and was retitled Smile of Love; it was released by Toho-Towa. Through 1978, the film was released in other countries, and on June 13, the film was released in the United States, and other countries, and was given the title Summer to Remember.

See also 
 
 List of Italian films of 1974

References

External links

1974 films
1974 drama films
1970s Italian-language films
Italian drama films
1970s Italian films